Simone Albrigi (born 8 October 1988 in Verona), better known under the pseudonym Sio, is an Italian comics artist and YouTuber.

Sio's YouTube channel Scottecs is one of most popular ones in Italy.

Biography 
He was educated at Ca' Foscari University of Venice.

In 2006, he joined the group Shockdom and published his first Comic L'uomo scottecs. The English version of the comic was released in 2012.

In 2015 he wrote some stories for Topolino.

On 30 May 2019, he published his first videogame Super Cane Magic ZERO - Legend of the Cane Cane.

Earlier that year, Sio became a father.

References

Italian comics artists
1988 births
Living people
Disney comics writers
 Italian YouTubers